Crosscurrent is a contemporary jazz record by saxophonist Chase Baird. It is his first album as a leader.

Track listing 
All tracks composed by Chase Baird; except where indicated

"Fifth Direction" – 5:18
"Crosscurrent" – 6:31
"Infinite Motion" – 6:22
"What's New?" (Bob Haggart and Johnny Burke) – 7:16
"Lunessence" – 6:47
"The Traveler" – 9:05
"Cascade" – 6:36
"Dusk" – 6:14
"All of You" (Cole Porter) – 9:07

Personnel
 Chase Baird – tenor saxophone
 Julian Waterfall Pollack – piano, keyboards
 John Storie – guitar
 Chris Tordini – acoustic bass
 Steve Lyman – drums
 James Yoshizawa – percussion

References

External links 

2010 albums
Chase Baird albums